Volleyball at the 2014 Asian Games was held in Incheon, South Korea from September 20 to October 3, 2014. In this tournament, 16 teams played in the men's competition, and 9 teams participated in the women's competition. All matches were played at the Songnim Gymnasium and the Ansan Sangnoksu Gymnasium.

Schedule

Medalists

Medal table

Draw
The draw ceremony for the team sports was held on 21 August 2014 at Incheon.

Men
The teams were distributed according to their position at the 2010 Asian Games using the serpentine system for their distribution.

Group A
 (Host)
 (8)

Group B
 (1)
 (7)

Group C
 (2)
 (6)

Group D
 (4)
 (5)

Women
The teams were distributed according to their position at the 2010 Asian Games using the serpentine system for their distribution.

Group A
 (Host)
 (4)

Group B
 (1)
 (3)

Final standing

Men

Women

References
Men's Results
Women's Results

External links
Official website

 
2014 Asian Games events
2014
Asian Games
2014 Asian Games